Dipsas oneilli, O'Neill's tree snake, is a non-venomous snake found in Peru.

References

Dipsas
Snakes of South America
Reptiles of Peru
Endemic fauna of Peru
Reptiles described in 1979